RTS 2 (RTS deux), launched on 1 September 1997 as TSR2 and renamed in 2012, is the second Swiss (French-speaking) public television channel owned by RTS Radio Télévision Suisse (RTS); the other is RTS 1.

Logos and identities

Programming 
The channel's programming is composed of reruns from the RTS 1 television archive, children's television programs in the morning and early afternoon, teens programs in the late afternoon and evening and cultural programs or sports transmissions during prime time.

External links

Television stations in Switzerland
Television channels and stations established in 1997
French-language television in Switzerland